Reza is an album released by Terry Gibbs in August, 1966 by Dot DLP 3726 (mono) and DLP 25726 (stereo).  It was arranged and produced by Shorty Rogers. The album was aimed at the pop and jazz markets. Billboard reviewed the album as "swingin, but not way out."

Track listing 
 "Missouri Waltz"
 "Autumn Leaves"
 "Secret Agent Man"
 "Norwegian Wood"
 "Canadian Sunset"
 "Sweet and Lovely"
 "Star Dust"
 "The Shadow of Your Smile"
 "Reza"
 "Soon"
 "Ebb Tide"
 "That Old Black Magic"

Personnel
 Terry Gibbs – vibraphone
 Russ Freeman – piano
 Mike Melvoin – organ
 Dennis Budimir – guitar
 Donald Peake – guitar
 Lyle Ritz – bass
 Hal Blaine – drums
 Julius Wechter – percussion

References

1966 albums
Dot Records albums
Terry Gibbs albums
Albums arranged by Shorty Rogers